Shafiqul Islam Khoka is a Bangladesh Krishak Sramik Awami League politician and the former Member of Parliament of Jamalpur-3.

Career
Khoka was elected to parliament from Jamalpur-3 as a Bangladesh Krishak Sramik Awami League candidate in 1986 and 1988.

Death
Khoka died on 15 September 2017 in United Hospital, Dhaka.

References

Bangladesh Krishak Sramik Awami League politicians
2017 deaths
3rd Jatiya Sangsad members
4th Jatiya Sangsad members
Year of birth missing